The 1971 Prague Skate was a senior international figure skating competition held 13–14 November 1971 in Czechoslovakia. Medals were awarded in the disciplines of men's and ladies' singles. Italian national champion Stefano Bargauan won the men's title ahead of Czechoslovakia's Zdeněk Pazdírek and Swiss champion Daniel Höner. After finishing 12th a year earlier, Hana Knapová took gold in the ladies' event, defeating future Olympic champion Anett Pötzsch of East Germany and Switzerland's Karin Iten.

Results

Men

Ladies

References

1971
1971 in Czechoslovakia
Prague